Yuto Suzuki (鈴木 雄斗, born December 7, 1993)  is a Japanese professional footballer who plays as a winger for J.League club Júbilo Iwata.

Club statistics

References

External links
Profile at Júbilo Iwata

1993 births
Living people
Association football people from Kanagawa Prefecture
Japanese footballers
J1 League players
J2 League players
Mito HollyHock players
Montedio Yamagata players
Kawasaki Frontale players
Gamba Osaka players
Matsumoto Yamaga FC players
Júbilo Iwata players
Association football midfielders